Christopher M. McCowen is an American convicted murderer. McCowen was found guilty in the 2002 rape and murder of Christa Worthington, a former fashion writer whose family had lived in Truro, Massachusetts, for generations.  McCowen was charged with the crimes in April 2005, more than three years after the discovery of Worthington's body in her Truro home on January 6, 2002.

McCowen had lived on Cape Cod since about 1998 and had been a garbage collector whose regular route included Worthington's home.  McCowen was charged on the basis of genetic fingerprinting and incriminating statements he made during a police interview.  On November 16, 2006, he was convicted of first-degree murder, aggravated rape, and aggravated armed burglary. He was sentenced to life without parole.

In December 2010, the Massachusetts Supreme Judicial Court denied an appeal for a new trial.

References

External links
Cape Cod Times: Christa Worthington murder case

African-American people
American people convicted of burglary
American prisoners sentenced to life imprisonment
American rapists
American people convicted of murder
People convicted of murder by Massachusetts
Prisoners sentenced to life imprisonment by Massachusetts
Living people
Criminals from Massachusetts
Year of birth missing (living people)